Brian McDonough  has been described as a Family Physician with a focus on patient education. In addition to providing clinical care he employs audio, video and digital technology to provide helpful information for the general public. 

As a dual citizen of the United States and Ireland, he consults and speaks internationally and during the pandemic his podcasts educated millions worldwide. The physician is a  member of the Broadcast Pioneers Hall of Fame. 

He has earned the title "Philadelphia's Family Physician" in his role as Medical Editor at KYW Newsradio since 1988 providing daily reports. He serves in a similar capacity at 1010WINS in New York City where he has been heard on a daily basis since 1996.

Early life and education
McDonough grew up outside of Philadelphia, Pennsylvania. He attended Archbishop Carroll High School in Radnor, Pennsylvania and upon graduation earned a Christian Brothers Scholarship to La Salle University where he graduated as a Biology-English Major. After graduation he attended Temple University School of Medicine. McDonough completed his Residency in Family Medicine at Saint Francis Hospital in Wilmington, Delaware an affiliate of The Temple University School of Medicine and completed a Fellowship in Faculty Development one year later at Temple.

Career
McDonough is Clinical Professor of Family Medicine and Community Health at Temple University Lewis Katz School of Medicine, where he has served since 1988. From 1993 to 1995 he was Acting Vice-Chairman of Family Medicine at Temple. McDonough was Chairman of Family Medicine at St. Francis Hospital (Wilmington, De) from 2008-2021 before ascending to the role of Chairman of The Graduate Medical Education (GMEC) in the Family Medicine Residency Program.  Dr. McDonough has been a faculty member in the program since 1993. McDonough has published four books and numerous articles during those years for both professional publications and the general public. From 2010 to 2016 he served on the Saint Francis Hospital Board of Directors. He is a Fellow of The American Academy of Family Physicians, American Association of Physician Leadership and The College of Physicians of Philadelphia. He has earned both The Health IT Leadership Certificate and the degree of Certified Physician Executive from The American College of Physician Executives.  McDonough combined his clinical role with the position of Chief Medical Information Officer in 2010. Over a ten year period led conversions to both the Meditech and Cerner platforms. The success of these projects gained the attention of Trinity Health leadership who planned to convert their health care facilities to the Epic platform and become the largest Epic client in the world.  In October, 2020 McDonough accepted the role of Trinity Health Mid-Atlantic Vice President and Chief Health Informatics Officer and agreed to remain in the role until the regional conversion to Epic. McDonough has returned to his career long focus on patient education.

Broadcasting
In addition to his duties as Medical Editor at KYW Newsradio in Philadelphia and i 1010 WINS in New York City, he has been syndicated on over two hundred radio stations. McDonough worked from 1989 to 2008 for Fox Television (Philadelphia)  and in the mid-1990s was a medical correspondent for NBC Today Show.   His podcasts "Coronavirus Today" on Spotify and the video partner "A Doctor in The Pandemic" have served as public education tools throughout the Covid-19 pandemic. In February, 2022 he created a video podcast called "The Dr. Brian McDonough Show" focusing on long form interviews with leaders in journalism, healthcare and politics.

Awards and honors

McDonough has received awards including: Family Physician of The Year, National Medical Broadcaster of The Year, The Sir William Osler Award for Bedside Teaching, and is an inductee in The Broadcast Pioneers Hall of Fame. He has been named DAFP Family Physician of The Year and in 1996 McDonough earned the Jules Bergman Award as National Medical Broadcaster of the Year. He was awarded an honorary Doctor of Humane Letters by his alma mater, LaSalle University, for his accomplishments in the medical field.  In 2019  McDonough graduated from The University of Galway with a degree in Irish Studies.

Personal life
McDonough has been married since 1991. He has three children and one grandchild.

References

American primary care physicians
Temple University faculty
Year of birth missing (living people)
Living people
Physicians from Philadelphia
Archbishop John Carroll High School alumni